Insel der Rosen is an East German film. It was released in 1958.

External links
 

1958 films
East German films
1950s German-language films
1950s German films